Sonant may refer to:

 Sonorant, particularly in Indo-European studies
 Voiced consonant, opposed to surd
 Syllabic consonant